George Kevin McGehee (born January 18, 1969) is former Major League Baseball pitcher.

External links

1969 births
Living people
Baseball players from Louisiana
Louisiana Tech Bulldogs baseball players
Baltimore Orioles players
Major League Baseball pitchers
William R. Boone High School alumni
Everett Giants players
Phoenix Firebirds players
Rochester Red Wings players
San Jose Giants players
Shreveport Captains players